Christopher J. McMullen (born 1952) is a career member of the Senior Foreign Service. He served as the United States Ambassador to Angola from October 2010 to June 12, 2013.

McMullen was raised in Pennsylvania and earned a bachelor's degree from West Chester University in 1974. He also received a master's degree in modern European history from West Chester University in 1976. McMullen graduated from Georgetown University with a PhD in Latin American history in 1980 as well as graduating from the National War College in 2001. He was later employed at Georgetown teaching Latin American history which he also taught at George Mason University. He also worked in the office of Senator John Glenn (D-Ohio) as a foreign affairs fellow and was also a senior analyst for the Department of Defense. After leaving his post in Angola, McMullen taught at the National War College.

References

1952 births
Living people
People from Pennsylvania
West Chester University alumni
Georgetown University alumni
Georgetown University faculty
George Mason University faculty
United States Foreign Service personnel
National War College alumni
Ambassadors of the United States to Angola
National War College faculty
21st-century American diplomats